The Synallactidae are a family of sea cucumbers, part of the order Synallactida.

Genera
 Allopatides Koehler & Vaney, 1905
 Amphigymnas Walsh, 1891
 Bathyplotes Östergren, 1896
 Capheira Ludwig, 1893
 Dendrothuria Koehler & Vaney, 1905
 Galatheathuria Hansen & Madsen, 1956
 Paelopatides Théel, 1886
 Pseudothuria Koehler & Vaney, 1905
 Scotothuria Hansen, 1978
 Synallactes Ludwig, 1894

References

Synallactida
Echinoderm families